Ismaël Abdul Rahman Roch Traoré (born 18 August 1986) is a professional footballer plays as a defender for  club Metz. Born in France, he plays for the Ivory Coast national team.

Career statistics

International

References

External links
 LFP profile 
 Profile at L'Équipe
 

1986 births
Living people
Footballers from Paris
Association football defenders
Ivorian footballers
Ivory Coast international footballers
French footballers
French sportspeople of Ivorian descent
Black French sportspeople
Ligue 1 players
Ligue 2 players
Championnat National 3 players
CS Sedan Ardennes players
Stade Brestois 29 players
Angers SCO players
FC Metz players
2013 Africa Cup of Nations players
2019 Africa Cup of Nations players